Derapeshtan (also Romanized as Derāpeshtān) is a village in Baz Kia Gurab Rural District, in the Central District of Lahijan County, Gilan Province, Iran. At the 2006 census, its population was 192, in 60 families.

References 

Populated places in Lahijan County